The Consulate General of France in Miami is the French diplomatic outpost in Florida. Under the leadership of the Consul General, it represents the interests of France and French People in the state, and provides services for French residents and expatriates.

It is located in on Brickell Avenue in the Miami Financial District.

Services
The Consulate is responsible for the provision of certain services to French citizens living in or travelling through Florida. In addition to these, it maintains strong links with the French community in all sectors of activities.

Consular Department 
The role of the Service is to issue French travel documents and IDs to French citizens and to provide assistance for French citizens in needs

The Cultural and Education Department 
This service is responsible for promoting and sharing French culture in Florida. It promotes French education, French teaching and bilingual exchanges

The Public Affairs Department
The Service handles media, press and social networks and provides informations on institutional affairs and business opportunities

See also

Franco-American relations
List of diplomatic missions of France
Embassy of France in Washington, D.C.
Consulate General of France in Atlanta

References

External links
French Consulate General, Miami
French Consulate General, Miami 

Miami
France
Buildings and structures in Miami
France–United States relations